Axiom Mission 1 (or Ax-1) was a privately funded and operated crewed mission to the International Space Station (ISS). The mission was operated by Axiom Space out of Axiom's Mission Control Center MCC-A in Houston, Texas. The flight launched on 8 April 2022 from Kennedy Space Center in Florida. The spacecraft used was a SpaceX Crew Dragon. The crew consisted of Michael López-Alegría, an American born in Spain and a professionally trained astronaut hired by Axiom, Eytan Stibbe from Israel, Larry Connor from the United States, and Mark Pathy from Canada.

Background 

Axiom Space was founded in 2016 with the goal of creating the world's first commercial space station. In early 2020, NASA announced that Axiom had been granted access to the forward port of the ISS' Harmony module, to which Axiom plans to berth the first node of the Axiom Orbital Segment; a complex that could grow to five pressurized modules after 2024 with a large observation window – similar to the current Cupola mounted on the Nadir side of Tranquility. This new addition to the ISS will be able to facilitate the company's activities in low Earth orbit. Prior to the first module's launch as early as 2024, Axiom planned to organize and fly crewed missions to the ISS, consisting of either paying private astronauts or astronauts from public agencies or private organizations. In March 2020, Axiom announced they would charter a flight to the ISS with SpaceX's Crew Dragon spacecraft as early as late 2021. This mission is the first wholly commercially-operated crewed mission to the ISS, and one of the first dedicated orbital private crew missions, alongside Roscosmos' Soyuz MS-20 mission in December 2021. Following their first flight, Axiom plans to offer crewed flights to the ISS as often as twice per year, "aligning with the flight opportunities as they are made available by NASA".

Crew 
Michael López-Alegría was chosen as a commercial astronaut. The other three seats were reserved for space tourists, announced to cost US$55 million each.

Following the launch of Crew Dragon Demo-2 in May 2020, the first crewed test flight of Dragon 2, Axiom CEO Michael Suffredini said that they planned to announce the names of the crew in "a month or so"; Ars Technica reported that the full crew complement would "probably be unveiled in January 2021". On 26 January 2021, Axiom revealed the full crew of the mission, consisting of Michael López-Alegría, Larry Connor, Mark Pathy and Eytan Stibbe. They also announced Peggy Whitson as the backup commander for the mission and John Shoffner as backup pilot. Eytan Stibbe's backup was his daughter Dr. Shir Stibbe.  Michael Lopez-Alegria is a former NASA astronaut and Axiom Space VP. John Shoffner is an airshow pilot and entrepreneur, and not an Axiom employee nor a government trained astronaut. Peggy Whitson is a former NASA astronaut and Axiom consultant.

It was reported that actor Tom Cruise and film producer Doug Liman would be passengers for a movie project, but it was later announced they will fly on a subsequent flight.

Prime crew

Backup crew

Mission 

The mission launched at 11:17 EDT on 8 April 2022. It launched atop a Falcon 9 Block 5 launch vehicle from Kennedy Space Center's Launch Complex 39A (LC-39A), a NASA-owned launch pad leased to SpaceX for Falcon 9 launches. The mission was flown aboard Crew Dragon Endeavour, which previously supported the Crew Dragon Demo-2 and SpaceX Crew-2 missions. From there the spacecraft spent less than a day in transit to the station and dock with Harmony, where they were planned to spend ten days aboard the International Space Station (ISS). Following their time on the ISS, the spacecraft undocked with plans to return to Earth via a splashdown in the Atlantic Ocean. Bad weather in the landing zone delayed the return, as result the crew spent 16 days docked to the ISS for a total of 17 days in orbit.

It was revealed that the "zero-g indicator" aboard the first private mission to visit the International Space Station was a toy dog called Caramel, the mascot for the Montreal Children's Hospital Foundation.

During their days aboard the ISS, the private crew conducted more than 25 different research experiments.

The Israeli mission segment is called Rakia, which means "sky" in Hebrew and is also the title of the book published with Ilan Ramon's diary fragments that survived the 2003 Space Shuttle Columbia disaster.

Connor also carried aboard three items on behalf of the Armstrong Air & Space Museum. With Connor being an Ohio-native, the items included a John Glenn senatorial campaign button, a patch of the Armstrong Air & Space Museum, and a piece of Kapton foil removed from the Apollo 11 Command Module after splashdown.

See also 
 Axiom Orbital Segment
 Axiom Mission 2
 List of Dragon 2 flights
 List of human spaceflights to the International Space Station
 Space Adventures Crew Dragon mission
 Inspiration4

References 

Spacecraft launched in 2022
2022 in the United States
Axiom Space
SpaceX Dragon 2
International Space Station
Orbital space tourism missions
SpaceX human spaceflights
Fully civilian crewed orbital spaceflights